The Howard Bison men's basketball team is the basketball team that represents Howard University in Washington, DC, United States. The school's team currently competes in the Mid-Eastern Athletic Conference. Howard most recently appeared in the NCAA tournament in 2023. The head coach of the Bison is Kenny Blakeney.

History

2020 season and Makur Maker 
In Summer 2020, the university received a commitment from Makur Maker, a five-star recruit out of Arizona and cousin of NBA players Thon and Matur Maker. It was the first successful recruitment of a major NBA prospect to an HBCU in the modern era, and Maker spoke of it as an attempt to "change the culture", namely that of recruits looking only to Power Five schools as their path to the pros. Maker would only play in two games for the Bison in his freshman season however, due to injury. 

In February 2021, the Bison would cancel the remainder of their season due to ongoing medical issues stemming from COVID-19.

Notable players 

 Makur Maker

Postseason results

NCAA tournament results
The Bison have appeared in the NCAA tournament three times. Their combined record is 0–3.

CBI results
The Bison have appeared in the College Basketball Invitational (CBI) once. Their record is 0–1.

References

External links